1000 Thalaivangi Apoorva Chinthamani (read as "Aayiram Thalaivangi Apoorva Chinthamani") is a 1947 Indian Tamil-language fantasy adventure film directed and produced by T. R. Sundaram. The screenplay was written by Sundaram and the dialogue by Bharathidasan. Music was composed by G. Ramanathan. The film stars P. S. Govindan and V. N. Janaki. The film was a big success among the masses. The film was remade in Telugu as Sahasra Sirchedha Apporva Chinthamani (1960) by the same studio.

Plot 
A Saint wants to become all powerful (Ashtamasithi) and prays to obtain such powers. He was told that if he could achieve the sacrifice of 1000 men, he shall achieve such a supreme power. As he cannot achieve this feat on his own, he works out a plan. Princess Apoorva Chinthamani is the daughter of King Neethi Kethu. Due to her intelligence, knowledge and interest in various arts, she is referred to as Apoorva Chinthamani. The happy King encourages her learn more. The magician comes to the Aditayapuri Kingdom in the garb of a Saint and becomes Chinthamani's teacher.

Gradually, he brings her under his control and manipulates her to achieve his goals. When she attains marriageable age, the magician advises that she should get an equally knowledgeable man and hence asks her to organise a contest whereby three peculiar questions will be asked to the aspiring grooms, those who fail to answer will beheaded. Since only the magician knows the answers, he is sure that he can behead 1000 prospective grooms who fail to answer and thus achieve his target of 1000 sacrifices.

The justification for the killings is to prevent leakage of the questions to other contestants. Chinthamani agrees and also convinces her father for the contest. The first to be sacrificed happens to be her cousin Purantharan, who is keen to marry her. In this manner, she kills 999 people, which includes six elder brothers of Prince Meyyazhagan. He decides to take revenge on Chinthamani when he learns about the killings, and comes to her kingdom with his friend and assistant Kali. They decide to find the questions and their answers before venturing to meet Chinthamani. In this process, the prince falls in love with Chinthamani's friend Princess Sengamalam.

Through her, he learns the questions. He goes to various countries named as Madhivadhanapuram, Sambangi Puram and Nathiseela Puram, finds the answers and brings the people involved with him to Chinthamani's palace. He answers the questions and wins the contest. Along with that, he also exposes the game plan of the magician, who gets killed by one of the kings affected by him. The prince advises Chinthamani to marry her cousin who was keen to marry her and marries her friend, Sengamalam.

Cast 

Male cast
 P. S. Govindan as Meiyazhagan
 M. R. Saminathan as Monk
 M. G. Chakrapani as Neethikethu
 E. R. Sahadevan as Purandharan
 K. K. Perumal as Gunapathi
 R. Balasubramaniam as Madhivadhanan
 Kali N. Rathnam as Kali
 T. S. Durairaj as Guard
 M. E. Madhavan as Velan
 V. M. Ezhumalai as Mannappan

Female cast
 V. N. Janaki as Apoorva Chinthamani
 S. Varalakshmi as Senkamalam
 R. Padma as Manjalazhagi
 M. Madhuri Devi as Dhampathi
 C. T. Rajakantham as Thangam
 P. R. Chandra as Velamma
 Susheela as Sundaravalli
 Saraswathi as Selavanayagam
 Chellam as Pachaiveni
 M. S. Subbulakshmi as Dancer

Soundtrack 
Music and lyrics were composed by G. Ramanathan.

References

Bibliography

External links 
 

1940s fantasy adventure films
1940s Tamil-language films
1947 films
Films based on Indian folklore
Films directed by T. R. Sundaram
Films scored by G. Ramanathan
Films set in 1947
Indian black-and-white films
Indian fantasy adventure films
Indian feminist films
Indian films based on plays
Indian musical films
Tamil films remade in other languages